The phantom eye syndrome (PES) is a phantom pain in the eye and  visual hallucinations after the removal of an eye (enucleation, evisceration).

Symptoms 
Many patients experience one or more phantom phenomena after the removal of the eye:
Phantom pain in the (removed) eye (prevalence: 26%)
Non-painful phantom sensations
Visual hallucinations. About 30% of patients report visual hallucinations of the removed eye. Most of these hallucinations consist of basic perceptions (shapes, colors). In contrast, visual hallucinations caused by severe visual loss without removal of the eye itself (Charles Bonnet syndrome) are less frequent (prevalence 10%) and often consist of detailed images.

Pathogenesis

Phantom pain and non-painful phantom sensations 
Phantom pain and non-painful phantom sensations result from changes in the central nervous system due to denervation of a body part. Phantom eye pain is considerably less common than phantom limb pain. The prevalence of phantom pain after limb amputation ranged from 50% to 78%. The prevalence of phantom eye pain, in contrast, is about 30%.

Post-amputation changes in the cortical representation of body parts adjacent to the amputated limb are believed to contribute to the development of phantom pain and non-painful phantom sensations. One reason for the smaller number of patients with phantom eye pain compared with those with phantom limb pain may be the smaller cortical somatosensory representation of the eye compared with the limbs.

In limb amputees, some, but not all, studies have found a correlation between preoperative pain in the affected limb and postoperative phantom pain. There is a significant association between painful and non-painful phantom experiences, preoperative pain in the symptomatic eye and headache. Based on the present data, it is difficult to determine if headaches or preoperative eye pain play a causal role in the development of phantom phenomena or if headache, preoperative eye pain, and postoperative phantom eye experiences are only epiphenomena of an underlying factor. However, a study in humans demonstrated that experimental pain leads to a rapid reorganization of the somatosensory cortex. This study suggests that preoperative and postoperative pain may be an important co-factor for somatosensory reorganization and the development of phantom experiences.

Visual hallucinations
Enucleation of an eye and, similarly, retinal damage, leads to a cascade of events in the cortical areas receiving visual input. Cortical GABAergic (GABA: Gamma-aminobutyric acid) inhibition decreases, and cortical glutamatergic excitation increases, followed by increased visual excitability or even spontaneous activity in the visual cortex. It is believed that spontaneous activity in the denervated visual cortex is the neural correlate of visual hallucinations.

Treatment
Treatment of painful phantom eye syndrome is provision of ocular prosthesis in the empty orbit.

See also 
Visual system
Charles Bonnet syndrome
Phantom limb

References

External links 

Visual system
Neurological disorders
Eye diseases
Syndromes
Hallucinations
Human eye